Jabiru is a species of stork, Jabiru mycteria, found in the Americas.  The term may also refer to:

Other birds
 Black-necked stork (Ephippiorhynchus asiaticus) of Asia and Australia, often called jabiru in Australia
 Saddle-billed stork (Ephippiorhynchus senegalensis) of sub-Saharan Africa, sometimes called jabiru

Aircraft and aerospace
Farman F.120, a family of multi-engined airliners built by Farman Aviation in France in the 1920s suffixed "Jabiru"
Farman F.170 Jabiru, a single-engined airliner built by Farman Aviation in France in the 1920s
 Jabiru, also called Jaguar, a British sounding rocket used for research from 1960 to 1964
 Jabiru Aircraft, a light aircraft manufacturer in Australia, maker of the following models:
 Jabiru 1600
 Jabiru 2200
 Jabiru 3300
 Jabiru J160
 Jabiru J170
 Jabiru J230
 Jabiru J430
 Jabiru Fleet, former models of Australian satellite made by NewSat

Other uses
 Jabiru, Northern Territory, a town in Australia
Jabiru Airport
Town of Jabiru, a former local government area in Northern Territory of Australia
 Jabiru's Palace, the official residence of the Vice President of Brazil

See also
Emu and the Jabiru, an Aboriginal Australian myth
Jabiru toadlet, a species of Australian toad
Jabru, an Elamite god of the underworld
 Jaburu, an alternative spelling for the stork, used as a tribe name in Survivor: The Amazon